Elizabeth Hankins Wolgast (February 27, 1929 – October 13, 2020) was an American philosopher. Wolgast was born in New Jersey. She died on October 13, 2020 following complications from a stroke.

Education
Wolgast graduated from Cornell University in 1952, studying modern literature at both undergraduate and masters level. She then moved to the University of Washington, where she completed her PhD, focusing on skepticism.

Work
Across her career, Wolgast taught and researched at a number of universities. In 1968, Wolgast was appointed to a teaching post at The Department of Philosophy at California State College at Hayward (now California State University, East Bay). She was later appointed an emeritus professor at the institution. Wolgast's work focused on liberal feminism, contemporary political philosophy, ethics and epistemology.

Bibliography

Books

Articles (selection)
 Moral Paradigms, Philosophy, 1995, Vol. 70, No. 272: 143-155 
 Innocence, Philosophy, 1993, Vol. 68, No. 265: 297-307
 The Virtue of a Representative, Social Theory and Practice, 1991, Vol. 17, No. 2: 273-293
 Moral Pluralism, Journal of Social Philosophy, 1990, Vol.23, No. 2-3: 108-116
 Whether Certainty is a Form of Life, Philosophical Quarterly, 1987, Vol. 37, No. 147: 151-165
 Wrong Rights Hypatia, 1987, Vol. 2, No. 1: 25-43

References

External links
 Elizabeth Wolgast's PhilPaper's page.

1929 births
2020 deaths
20th-century American philosophers
American women philosophers
California State University, East Bay faculty
Cornell University alumni
University of Washington alumni
20th-century American women
People from Dunellen, New Jersey
21st-century American women